Scaffold attachment factor B2 is a protein that in humans is encoded by the SAFB2 gene.

Interactions 

SAFB2 has been shown to interact with Estrogen receptor alpha and SAFB.

References

Further reading